Neven Radaković (born 12 January 1994) is a Serbian footballer playing with Scarborough SC in the Canadian Soccer League.

Playing career

Europe 
Radakovic began playing in 2012 in the Serbian League West with FK Vujić Valjevo. He later played in the Vojvodina League East with FK Jedinstvo Novi Bečej, and in 2014 was loaned to FK Polet Ljubić in the Serbian League West. In 2014, he played abroad in the Macedonian First Football League with FK Sileks. After a season abroad he played in the Serbian League Vojvodina with FK Dunav Stari Banovci, and later with FK Banat Zrenjanin. In 2016, he played in the Serbian First League with Sloboda Uzice, but shortly after returned to the Serbian League Vojvodina with FK Odžaci.

Canada 
In 2018, he played abroad for the second time in the Canadian Soccer League with Scarborough SC. In his debut season, he assisted Scarborough in securing a postseason berth by finishing fourth in the First Division. He played in the opening round of the playoffs where he contributed a goal against Hamilton City which helped the eastern Toronto side advance to the next round. He played in the CSL Championship final where Scarborough was defeated by FC Vorkuta in a penalty shootout. 

He re-signed with Scarborough for the 2019 season. In his second stint with the Toronto side, the club secured a playoff berth by finishing runners-up in the division. He made further contributions in the postseason competition by recording a goal in the semifinals against Kingsman SC which sent Scarborough to the finals for the third consecutive season. Radaković was featured in the championship final where Scarborough successfully defeated FC Ukraine United for the title. 

He returned to Scarborough for his third season in 2020. Throughout the regular season, he assisted the club in securing their first divisional title and featured in the championship final for the fourth consecutive season. Unfortunately, the club was defeated by a score of 2-1 to Vorkuta. His contract was renewed for the 2021 season, marking his fourth season with the club. Scarborough qualified for the playoffs where he helped the club secure their second championship title after defeating Vorkuta. He also appeared in the ProSound Cup final where the Toronto side was defeated in a penalty shootout by Vorkuta. 

Radaković re-signed with Scarborough for his fifth season in 2022. He helped the eastern Toronto side secure a postseason once more by finishing third throughout the regular season. During the season the club also achieved an undefeated streak of 18 matches. In the opening round of the playoffs, he contributed a goal against BGH City FC which helped advance the club to the next round. Radaković played in Scarborough's run to the championship final, which the eastern Toronto side lost to FC Continentals (formerly FC Vorkuta).

Honors 
Scarborough SC
 CSL Championship: 2019, 2021
 Canadian Soccer League First Division: 2020

References 
 

1994 births
Living people
Serbian footballers
FK Polet Ljubić players
FK Sileks players
FK Banat Zrenjanin players
FK Sloboda Užice players
Scarborough SC players
Macedonian First Football League players
Serbian First League players
Canadian Soccer League (1998–present) players
Association football midfielders
Serbian League players